I Cry by Night is a studio album by Kay Starr. It was released in 1962 by Capitol Records (catalog no. T-1681). In 2014, Universal Music Group made the album available on YouTube with 24 bit mastering.

Upon its release, Billboard magazine gave the album its highest rating of four stars and wrote: "Kay Starr sings from the heart here, backed by an instrumental group that contributes a jazz feeling to the package."

AllMusic later gave the album a rating of two stars.

Track listing
Side A
 "I'm Alone Because I Love You"
 "I Cry by Night"
 "Baby Won't You Please Come Home"
 "More Than You Know"
 "Lover Man (Oh, Where Can You Be?)"
 "My Kinda Love"

Side B
 "It Had to Be You"
 "Whispering Grass"
 "Nevertheless"
 "What Do You See In Her?"
 "PS I Love You"
 "I'm Still In Love With You"

References

1962 albums
Kay Starr albums
Capitol Records albums